Sluis is a town and municipality located in the west of Zeelandic Flanders, in the south-western Dutch province of Zeeland.

The current incarnation of the municipality has existed since 1 January 2003. The former municipalities of Oostburg and Sluis-Aardenburg merged on that date. The latter of these two municipalities was formed from a merger between the previous municipality named Sluis and the former municipality of Aardenburg in 1995.

History

The town received city rights in 1290. In 1340 the Battle of Sluys was fought nearby at sea during the Hundred Years' War.  There is a record of one of the first lotteries with money on 9 May 1455 of 1737 florins (US$170,000, in 2014).

During the Eighty Years' War in 1587 the town was captured by Spanish troops under the Duke of Parma and was retaken in 1604 by a Dutch and English force under Maurice of Nassau.

From 2006 until its closure in 2013, Oud Sluis was one of only two Michelin three-starred restaurants in the entire country.

Geography

In addition to the town of Sluis itself, the municipality is made up of the following population centres:

Sint Anna ter Muiden, with a population of only 50 (2001), is a small village about 1 km west of the town of Sluis, located on the westernmost point of the Netherlands.

Demography 
The population of the city is 2,040 (as of 2001).

Transport 
A ferry connection across the Westerschelde exists between Breskens and Vlissingen. After the opening of the Westerschelde tunnel near Terneuzen in 2003, the ferry now carries only pedestrian and bicycle traffic.

Notable people 

 John Crabbe (before 1305 in Muide – 1352) a Flemish merchant, pirate and soldier
 Joost de Soete (ca.1510/1520 in Sluis – 1589) a Dutch nobleman and Field Marshal
 Jacob van Loo (1614 in Sluis – 1670) a painter of the Dutch Golden Age
 Joan Blasius (1639 in Cadzand — 1672) a Dutch poet, playwright, translator and lawyer
 Johanna Jacoba van Beaumont (ca.1752 in Sluis - 1827) a politically active journalist, feminist and editor
 Johan Hendrik van Dale (1828 in Sluis - 1872) a Dutch teacher, archivist and lexicographer
 Ernst Oppler (1867–1929) German impressionist painter, lived for some years in Sluis
 Jan Eekhout (1900 in Sluis - 1978) a Dutch writer, poet, translator and Nazi
 Herman Wijffels (born 1942 in Turkeye) a retired Dutch politician and businessman
 Hans Wijers (born 1951 in Oostburg) a retired Dutch politician and businessman
 Ate de Jong (born 1953 in Aardenburg) a Dutch film director

Sport 
 Willem van Hanegem (born 1944 in Breskens) a Dutch former football midfielder with over 50 caps and 600 appearances in the top flight of association football
 Annabel Kosten (born 1977 in Oostburg) a retired freestyle swimmer, bronze medallist at the 2004 Summer Olympics

Gallery

See also
 Zwin

References

External links

Official website (in Dutch)

 
Zeelandic Flanders
Populated places in Zeeland
Municipalities of Zeeland
Municipalities of the Netherlands disestablished in 1995
Municipalities of the Netherlands established in 2003
Cities in the Netherlands